Willian may refer to:

Places 
 Willian, Hertfordshire, a small village in North Hertfordshire, England

People 
 Willian (footballer, born 1983), Willian Xavier Barbosa, Brazilian former football forward
 Willian (footballer, born 1986), Willian Gomes de Siqueira, Brazilian football forward for Palmeiras
 Willian (footballer, born 1988), Willian Borges da Silva, Brazilian international football winger for Fulham
 Willian Formiga (born 1995), Willian Prado Camargo, Brazilian football left-back for Cianorte
 Willian (footballer, born 2002), Willian Eduardo Rosa Mateus, Brazilian football forward for Caxias

See also 
 Willians (disambiguation)
 William (disambiguation)